Maude Michaud (born December 23, 1983) is a Canadian screenwriter, filmmaker and actress. She is best known for her first feature-length film Dys- (2014), which she wrote, directed, produced and edited.

Early life 

Maude Michaud is from Greenfield Park, Quebec. She began drama lessons when she was nine years old. By the age of sixteen, she made her first short film, Finding Hope, which was chosen for the official selection in Toronto's International Teen Movie Festival. By seventeen, her second short film, Spirits, which was her first work in the horror genre, was also screened at this festival.

Education 
Michaud did all of her post-collegiate studies at Montreal's Concordia University, where she obtained her bachelor's degree in communication studies and film production with a minor in project management. She has since graduated with a master's degree in media studies.

Her master's thesis titled "Horror Grrrls: Resistance and Agency within the Interpretive Community of Women Horror Filmmakers" focuses primarily on women in the horror genre. It consisted of a written element as well as a documentary web series titled Bloody Breasts, which examined women's role in the horror film industry and tackled certain prepossessed notions about women's relation to this genre.

Career 
By day, Michaud works for an organization which creates media content. Her position within the organization requires her to accommodate various events and projects. In 2001, Michaud founded her own Montreal-based film production company, Quirk Films. Through her production company, she has released various audio-visual works as well as some films, including her first feature-length film, Dys-.

Dys- 
In 2014 Dys-, premiered at Montreal's International Fantasia Film Festival. The film chronicles a couple who quarantine themselves inside their condo when the news of a viral outbreak surfaces. The two main characters, whose marriage is in shambles, must face the mysterious pandemic while the proximity to one another only serves to pull them apart even further. Together, Eva and Sam are forced to confront their innermost demons.

Filmography

References 

1986 births
21st-century Canadian screenwriters
Living people
Canadian women film directors
Canadian women screenwriters
People from Longueuil
Film directors from Montreal
Writers from Quebec
21st-century Canadian women writers